{{DISPLAYTITLE:C22H25NO5}}
The molecular formula C22H25NO5 (molar mass: 383.437 g/mol, exact mass: 383.1733 u) may refer to:

 Acetylpropionylmorphine
 Sacubitrilat

Molecular formulas